B. polymorpha may refer to:

 Bambusa polymorpha, a clumping bamboo
 Bouteloua polymorpha, a Grama grass
 Bovista polymorpha, a true puffball
 Bulgaria polymorpha, a fungus found in temperate regions